Irgendwie und Sowieso is a German television series.

See also
List of German television series

External links
 

1986 German television series debuts
1986 German television series endings
Television series set in the 1960s
Television shows set in Bavaria
German-language television shows
Das Erste original programming